The Ambassador of Australia to Saudi Arabia is an officer of the Australian Department of Foreign Affairs and Trade and the head of the Embassy of the Commonwealth of Australia to the Kingdom of Saudi Arabia. The ambassador resides in Riyadh and also holds non-resident accreditation for Bahrain, Oman and Yemen. Australia appointed its first ambassador to Saudi Arabia in 1974. 

Initially the embassy was located in Jeddah, and it was moved in 1984 to Riyadh, to comply with a Saudi Government policy directive. The Jeddah post remained open, as a Consulate-General.

The current ambassador, since October 2021, is Mark Donovan.

List of heads of mission

Notes 
: Also served as non-resident ambassador of Australia to the Kingdom of Bahrain, since 1996.
: Also served as non-resident ambassador of Australia to the Sultanate of Oman, since 1996.
: Also served as non-resident ambassador of Australia to the Republic of Yemen, from 1998 to December 2007, and since March 2015.
: Also served as non-resident ambassador of Australia to the State of Kuwait, from 1998 to December 2004.

References

 
Saudi Arabia
Australia